Apocalyptic Raids is an EP by the Swiss extreme metal band Hellhammer. It was recorded and released in March 1984, and was the band's only commercial release.

The record was a major influence on the then-emerging death metal and black metal genres. It has served as an inspiration to such varied and respected bands as Napalm Death and Sepultura, both of whom recorded cover versions of "Messiah".

Hellhammer split up only three months after recording this EP, and later regrouped as Celtic Frost. The EP would be reissued six years later as Apocalyptic Raids 1990 A.D., boasting new artwork and two bonus tracks.

Artwork
The cover art of Apocalyptic Raids is influenced by German Expressionism's stark aesthetic, combining monochromaticity with the band's blood-red, blackletter-styled logo.

Track listings

Tracks 5 and 6 were originally part of the now out-of-print Death Metal (1984) compilation.

Credits

Original 1984 release
Hellhammer – producers
Satanic Slaughter ( Tom Warrior) – V-Axe Holocaust (guitar), Dambuster Vocals (lead vocals)
Slayed Necros (a.k.a. Martin Ain) – Deadly Bassdose (bass), Backing Howling... (backing vocals)
Denial Fiend (a.k.a. Bruce Day) – Hellish Crossfire on Wooden Coffins (drums)
Horst Mueller – engineer
Thomas Fischer – cover design, frontcover drawing "The Sitting Death" (© 1984)
Mr. Jeckyl – heptagram
Burzelbar – pix

Apocalyptic Raids 1990 A.D.
 Tom G. Warrior – vocals, guitar, backing vocals
 Martin E. Ain – bass, cover design
 Bruce Day – drums
 Horst Müller – engineer, mixing
 Julia Schechner – layout
 José Posada – illustrations
 Karl U. Walterbach – executive producer

Charts

References

Hellhammer albums
Noise Records EPs
1984 EPs
1990 EPs